Incline High School is located in Incline Village, Nevada near Lake Tahoe. It is accredited by the Northwest Association of Secondary and Higher Schools. It is part of the Washoe County School District. They also have multiple championship-winning sports teams called the “Highlanders”.

References

External links 
 Official site

Public high schools in Nevada
Schools in Washoe County, Nevada
Washoe County School District